Andrew Sylvester Clarkin (1891 – 23 November 1955) was an Irish Fianna Fáil politician.

Born in Mullingar, County Westmeath, Clarkin was the son of Andrew Clarkin and Rose Anne Corrigan He stood for election to Dáil Éireann as a Fianna Fáil candidate for the Dublin South constituency at the 1944 general election but was unsuccessful. He was elected to Seanad Éireann by the Administrative Panel at the 1944 Seanad election. He was re-elected to the Seanad at the 1948, 1951 and 1954 Seanad elections on the Industrial and Commercial Panel. He was an unsuccessful candidate at the 1952 Dublin North–West by-election. He died in 1955 during the 8th Seanad.

He served as Lord Mayor of Dublin from 1951 to 1953.

References

External links

1891 births
1955 deaths
Fianna Fáil senators
Members of the 5th Seanad
Members of the 6th Seanad
Members of the 7th Seanad
Members of the 8th Seanad
Lord Mayors of Dublin
People from Mullingar